Shakotan may refer to:
Shakotan, Hokkaidō
Shakotan District, Hokkaidō
Shakotan Peninsula
 (シャコタン), a type of modified car associated with the  subculture